Alhucemas is a Spanish name which may refer to:

The Moroccan Rif city of Al Hoceima
The Spanish Alhucemas Islands, including Peñón de Alhucemas